The Students' Union of Obafemi Awolowo University, popularly addressed as Great Ife Students' Union, is the leading and most vibrant Students' Union in Nigeria and Sub-Saharan Africa. The Obafemi Awolowo University Students' Union is the body of the over thirty-five thousand students of the first class Nigerian University.

The Students' Union is known for defending students' rights around Africa. On 11 March 2010, the Students' Union, led by Alaje A. Paul, President of the organization at the time, participated in a protest in F.C.T. Abuja. This was in defense of sections S144 and 145 of the Nigerian Constitution.

Past leaders of the Students' Union include Anthony Fashayo, Lanre Legacy, Ola Diamonds, Akinola Saburi, Deviano, Paul Alaje, Fredrick Joel, Ibikunle Isaac, and Akande Omotayo.

Current leadership 
President – Olayiwola Folahan Festus “Reform”

Vice-President – Aworanti Salvation Grace “Salvation”

Secretary General – Odewale Samuel Damilare “Great-Sam”

Public Relations Officer – Ogunperi Taofeek Olalekan “Tao”

Financial Secretary – Oluwasegun Joy Abiola “Legbeti”

Welfare Officer – Dada Arafat Modupe ”Holistic Welfarist”

Assistant Secretary General – Abdulganiyu Ismail “Mastermind”

Directory of Socials and Culture – Adeboye Olamilekan “Omo Alhaji”

Director of Sports – Ogundana Ayotunde “Oluwanöni”

References

Students' unions in Nigeria